Doto lancei is a species of sea slug, a nudibranch, a marine gastropod mollusc in the family Dotidae.

Distribution
This species was first described from Baja California Peninsula, Mexico. It has been reported from the Pacific coast of North America from San Diego south to Costa Rica.

Description
This species of Doto has a cream coloured body with extensive areas of dark brown or black pigment on the back and sides. The most well-developed ceratal tubercles have rings of dark pigment at their bases and a dark spot at the tip.

EcologyDoto lancei feeds on the hydroid Aglaophenia'' sp., family Aglaopheniidae.

References

Dotidae
Gastropods described in 1967